Thomson-Leng Musical Society is a Dundee-based theatrical organisation. Originally established for employees’ of D. C. Thomson & Co., the society today welcomes members from the general public and continues to produce musical theatre productions of varied genres within the city of Dundee.

History
Founded in 1964, Thomson-Leng Musical Society was originally established for employees of D.C. Thomson & Co. Ltd. as an opportunity for the workforce to gather together and have fun in staging musical productions. 

The original Society went from being exclusively for DC Thomson employees, to including family members of the employees to finally becoming a Musical Society that welcomes members of the general public.

In 1998, the Society created a Youth Music Theater. 

The Society produces one main musical production and a pantomime each year along with other events held throughout the year.

Committee
The Management Committee of Thomson-Leng Musical Society is composed of three Executive Committee members and other active committee members. The members are elected at the Annual General Meeting, which is held in the Autumn. The Committee oversees the running of both Thomson-Leng Musical Society (TLMS) and Thomson-Leng Youth Music Theatre (TLYMT).

The membership of the Committee, as of October 2019, is as follows:

Previous Shows

Musical theatre companies
Organisations based in Dundee
Clubs and societies in Dundee
Amateur theatre companies in Scotland